Powassan is a municipality in the Canadian province of Ontario, located near North Bay. Powassan is located in the Almaguin Highlands region of Parry Sound District, at its easternmost boundary with the Nipissing District.

The municipality includes the population centres of Powassan and Trout Creek, both along Highway 11.

History
Taken from a First Nations name that means "bend", Powassan's original settlement was at the bend of the South River. The location today is known as the Bingham Chute, and is where the present hydro plant is. The village of Powassan began in/about 1880 with the construction of a sawmill and a grist mill. Mill employees built their houses in that section of the village.

A construction camp for the Northern and Pacific Junction Railway was established at Powassan in 1885. This section of track completed in 1886, was taken over by the Grand Trunk Railway in 1888 and absorbed by Canadian National Railways in 1923.

In 1886, the operation of the Northern and Pacific Junction Railway between Gravenhurst and Nipissing Junction saw the development of a second settlement near the railroad. Christopher Armstrong and William Faulkner Clark were granted two lots by the Crown, lots 15 and 16, respectively, in the 12th concession of the Township of Himsworth. The 15th sideroad of the Township of Himsworth was the road allowance reserve between the two lots, which is the present-day Main Street, Powassan's main thoroughfare.
Armstrong divided lot 15 into sections that were 1/5 of an acre in size; Clark divided lots into lots of 1/4 acre each. Clark's plans are registered as numbers 43 and 57.

On November 30, 1904, a Royal Proclamation was issued that declared that Powassan was a separate and new municipality. In the same proclamation, the citizens were constituted a body corporate under the name of the Corporation of the Town of Powassan. In 1906, the present town hall was built.

The current Municipality of Powassan came into being on January 1, 2001 as a result of the amalgamation of the Town of Powassan, Town of Trout Creek and the Township of South Himsworth. The two main communities in the town are Powassan and Trout Creek.

Climate

Demographics 

See also
List of townships in Ontario

References

External links

Municipalities in Parry Sound District
Single-tier municipalities in Ontario